A referendum on the construction of public buildings was held in Liechtenstein on 7 March 1993. Voters were asked whether they approved of the construction of a new Landtag building and some other buildings. The proposal was rejected by 79.6% of voters.

Results

References

1993 referendums
1993 in Liechtenstein
Referendums in Liechtenstein
March 1993 events in Europe